Elise Alsand (born 26 September 1972) is a Norwegian team handball player who played for the clubs Nordstrand IF and Våg, and on the Norway women's national handball team. She became European champion in 1998.

Alsand made her debut on the national team in 1998.

References

External links

1972 births
Living people
Norwegian female handball players
20th-century Norwegian women